= Miriam bat Benayah =

Jewish scribe (late 1400 – early 1500)

Miriam bat Benayah (late 15th-century - early 16th-century) was a Jewish Safra (scribe) in Yemen.

Bat Benayah was the daughter of scribe Benayah ben Sa'adiah ben Zekhariah, and worked with her father and her brothers David and Joseph. They are credited with copying 400 books together, including prayer books, collections of haftarot, and copies of the Torah. It was highly uncommon for a woman to have the profession of scribe in the culture, time and place in which she was active.

In one scroll of the Pentateuch which she had written, she added the statement: "Please be indulgent of the shortcomings of this volume; I copied it while nursing a baby."

== Sources ==
- The JPS Guide to Jewish Women: 600 B.C.E.to 1900 C.E.
- https://www.encyclopedia.com/religion/encyclopedias-almanacs-transcripts-and-maps/miriam-bat-benayah
